The Skoda 75 mm Model 1939 (75 mm M.39) was a mountain gun manufactured in by Skoda Works and exported in small numbers to Romania and Iran. The design was related to the Bofors L/22 sold to Switzerland. For transport, the gun could be broken into eight sections and carried by mule. The gun crew was protected by an armoured shield. Romanian guns equipped two mountain artillery battalions.

Notes

References
 Chamberlain, Peter and Gander, Terry. Infantry, Mountain and Airborne Guns

World War II field artillery
Artillery of Czechoslovakia
World War II mountain artillery
75 mm artillery
Military equipment introduced in the 1930s